The Mix is a 2000 film by the Iranian director Dariush Mehrjui. The film was scripted by Mehrjui and lensed by Mahmoud Kalari. It starred Khosro Shakibai, Negar Foroozandeh, Mohamad Reza Sharifinia, Leila Hatami and Ali Mosaffa.

Plot

Cast 
 Khosro Shakibai
 Negar Foroozandeh
 Mohamad Reza Sharifinia
 Leila Hatami
 Ali Mosaffa

References

Iranian comedy-drama films
2000s Persian-language films
Films directed by Dariush Mehrjui
Films about filmmaking
Films set in Iran
Films about films